Lin Chieh-liang (30 June 1958 – 5 August 2013) was a Taiwanese physician, nephrologist and toxicologist. He was a longtime public health advocate and adviser to the Department of Health of the Republic of China, well known for his public response to national health scares.

Education and medical career
Lin trained as a nephrologist at Taipei Medical University. He later worked at Chang Gung Memorial Hospital in Linkou, New Taipei, serving as the director of the hospital's toxicology department.

Public health advocacy
Lin was a leading public health advocate, and one of Taiwan's best-known toxicologists. He gained a reputation as a public health expert and science communicator during a series of mass scares in Taiwan over health issues, including hornet attacks, lead poisoning and contaminated food. He regularly advised the Taiwanese Department of Health and Welfare on medical policy, food safety and potential threats to public health. Lin also conducted research into new vaccines and their effects on human health, and established a medical service team to provide free health consultations in poorer communities.

Death
On 2 August 2013, Lin lapsed into a coma after contracting a lung infection; prior to this, he had undergone dialysis for 20 years due to renal problems. His condition rapidly worsened, and on 5 August he died, aged 55, of pneumonia and multiple organ failure at his former workplace, Chang Gung Memorial Hospital. The hospital subsequently set up a medical research fund in Lin's honour.

References

External links
"Many are eager to carry out the legacy of Lin Chieh-liang". Formosa English News via YouTube. 8 August 2013.

1958 births
2013 deaths
Taiwanese toxicologists
Deaths from sepsis
Deaths from pneumonia in Taiwan